Moses J. "Chief" Yellow Horse (January 28, 1898 – April 10, 1964) was an American professional baseball pitcher. He played two seasons in Major League Baseball for the Pittsburgh Pirates, 1921 and 1922. An Oklahoma native, Yellow Horse, a Native American from the Pawnee tribe, was the first full-blooded American Indian to have played in the major leagues.

Early life
Yellow Horse was born in Indian Territory (present-day Oklahoma) to Clara and Thomas Yellow Horse in early 1898 (one source lists his given name as "Mose", though all other sources give it as "Moses"). Yellow Horse was a full-blooded Native American since his parents were Native Americans of unmixed ancestry. Additionally, he was ordered to attend a traditional school by the Indian Agency. It was at the Chilocco Indian Agricultural School that Yellow Horse started his baseball career. In 1917, he performed at a high level for the school, and compiled a win–loss record of 17–0.

Professional baseball career
After Yellow Horse left Chilocco, he went to pitch for the Little Rock Travelers of the minor league Southern Association. In 1920, under the tutelage of Kid Elberfeld, he helped the team to its first championship.

In 1921, Yellow Horse joined the Pittsburgh Pirates. His major league debut was on April 15 in relief of Earl Hamilton. The Pirates won the game 3–1 over Eppa Rixey and the Cincinnati Reds. Later that year, he ruptured his arm and had to have surgery. His injury forced him to sit out two months. The next year, Yellow Horse injured his arm a second time. The injury was purportedly a result of a fall he took while drunk. Over his two-year stay with the Pirates, Yellow Horse was used primarily as a reliever, and compiled a record of 8 wins and 4 losses.

While with the Pirates, Yellow Horse befriended Rabbit Maranville. The relationship had a profound impact on his life as Maranville introduced Yellow Horse to alcohol; he began to drink substantial amounts of liquor on a frequent basis. Later in life, Yellow Horse identified himself as an alcoholic.

Unable to pitch in the major leagues, either because of his behavior and/or his injuries, Yellow Horse went to play minor league baseball. In 1923, he was sent to play with the Sacramento Senators of the Pacific Coast League. The next year, he suffered another serious arm injury and Sacramento traded him to Fort Worth, Texas. Shortly thereafter, Fort Worth returned him to Sacramento. He spent two more years with Sacramento when, in January 1926, Sacramento sold Moses to Omaha. He pitched the final game of his professional career on May 1, 1926.

While Yellow Horse is believed to be the first full-blooded Native American to play major league baseball, there had been previous major league baseball players of Native American ancestry. These included Louis Sockalexis (Cleveland Spiders, 1897–1899), Charles Albert (Chief) Bender (primarily the Philadelphia Athletics, 1903–1917), and John (Chief) Meyers (primarily the New York Giants, 1909–1917).

Alcoholism and later life
By 1923, news of Yellow Horse's drinking problems reached the Pawnee tribal members in Oklahoma. In addition to the physical problems he had as a result of the drinking, this created tension between Yellow Horse and the tribe. After he retired from baseball, he spent the next 18 years working jobs that did not provide him with much disposable income. His continued drinking remained a divider between him and the tribe.

1945 was an important year for Yellow Horse. For unknown reasons, he stopped drinking cold turkey, and was able to find steady work. His first job was with the Ponca City farm team, and his second job was with the Oklahoma State Highway Department. Yellow Horse also served as groundskeeper for the Ponca City ballclub in 1947, and coached an all-Indian baseball team. Eventually, his relationship with the tribe improved and he became an honored member; a sports field was named after him in Pawnee, Oklahoma. He was also able to remain sober for the remainder of his life. Yellow Horse died on April 10, 1964, at the age of 66 in Oklahoma.

Dick Tracy and Yellow Pony
Like Yellow Horse, cartoonist Chester Gould was also born on the Pawnee reservation. Gould used Yellow Horse in his Dick Tracy comic strip as the model for a character named Yellow Pony. Other than the name, the only real similarity between live model and comic strip character was a big, strong physique.

Statistics

Notes

References

Further reading 

 Weber.edu Poems about Chief Yellow Horse

External links 
, or Baseball Almanac

Major League Baseball pitchers
Pittsburgh Pirates players
Des Moines Boosters players
Little Rock Travelers players
Sacramento Senators players
Omaha Buffaloes players
Baseball players from Oklahoma
20th-century Native Americans
Native American sportspeople
Pawnee people
People from Pawnee, Oklahoma
1898 births
1964 deaths
Dick Tracy